This is list of awards and nominations received by a Korean-American singer-songwriter Amy Lee, better known by her stage name Ailee. Ailee debuted with the song "Heaven" in 2012 and received several awards within her first year as an artist. She was signed to YMC Entertainment in South Korea and Warner Music in Japan. She has won 39 music awards.



Awards and nominations

References 

Lists of awards received by South Korean musician
Lists of awards received by American musician
Awards